Christel Kimbembe (born 23 May 1982, in Brazzaville) is a Congolese football defender who currently plays for UJA Alfortville.

He is a regular player for the Congo national football team.

Clubs
1998-1999:  Diables Noirs
1999-2000:  Abeille
2000-2002:  Massy FC
2002-2007:  US Créteil
2007-2009:  AS Cherbourg
2010-  :  UJA Alfortville

External links

 

1982 births
Living people
Sportspeople from Brazzaville
Republic of the Congo footballers
Republic of the Congo international footballers
US Créteil-Lusitanos players
AS Cherbourg Football players
Association football defenders